Justin Paul Williams (born August 20, 1995) is an American professional baseball outfielder who is a free agent. He has played in Major League Baseball (MLB) for the Tampa Bay Rays and St. Louis Cardinals.

Amateur career
Williams attended Terrebonne High School in Houma, Louisiana. He hit .443 with 22 home runs and 67 runs batted in (RBI) over 79 games. Williams was drafted by the Arizona Diamondbacks in the second round of the 2013 Major League Baseball draft.

Professional career

Arizona Diamondbacks
Williams signed with the Diamondbacks rather than play college baseball at Louisiana State University (LSU) and made his professional debut that season with Arizona League Diamondbacks. He also played with the Missoula Osprey and South Bend Silver Hawks that season. He hit .351 with one home run in 51 games. In 2014, he played for Missoula and South Bend. In 74 games he hit .351 with four home runs and 46 RBIs.

Tampa Bay Rays
On November 14, 2014, Williams along with Andrew Velazquez was traded from the Diamondbacks to the Tampa Bay Rays for Jeremy Hellickson. He spent 2015 with the Bowling Green Hot Rods and Charlotte Stone Crabs, compiling a combined .277 batting average with seven home runs and 48 RBIs in 122 games, and 2016 with Charlotte and the Montgomery Biscuits where he batted .295 with ten home runs and 59 RBIs in 90 total games. In 2017, Williams played for Montgomery where he slashed .301/.364/.489 with 14 home runs and 72 RBIs in 96 games.

The Rays added him to their 40-man roster after the 2017 season. Williams was promoted to the major leagues for the first time on July 21, 2018.

St. Louis Cardinals
On July 31, 2018, Williams, along with Génesis Cabrera and Roel Ramírez, were traded to the St. Louis Cardinals in exchange for Tommy Pham. Williams was optioned to the minors and would not appear in the major leagues again until September 16, 2020. In 2021, Williams made the Opening Day roster after batting .229 with one home run over 35 spring training at-bats. Williams hit his first major-league home run on April 16, 2021, off of Zach Eflin, in a game against the Philadelphia Phillies. He was eventually placed on the injured list. Over 51 games prior to the injury, he batted .160/.270/.261 with four home runs and 11 RBIs. After being activated, he was optioned to the Memphis Redbirds with whom he finished the year. He was removed from the 40-man roster on November 5, 2021 and elected free agency on November 9. He became a free agent following the season.

Philadelphia Phillies
On March 8, 2022, Williams signed a minor league contract with the Philadelphia Phillies organization. He elected free agency on November 10, 2022.

References

External links

1995 births
Living people
African-American baseball players
Sportspeople from Houma, Louisiana
Baseball players from Louisiana
Major League Baseball outfielders
Tampa Bay Rays players
St. Louis Cardinals players
Arizona League Diamondbacks players
Missoula Osprey players
South Bend Silver Hawks players
Bowling Green Hot Rods players
Charlotte Stone Crabs players
Brisbane Bandits players
Montgomery Biscuits players
Peoria Javelinas players
Durham Bulls players
Springfield Cardinals players
Memphis Redbirds players
Águilas de Mexicali players
American expatriate baseball players in Australia
American expatriate baseball players in Mexico
21st-century African-American sportspeople